Keung Wing Ning was a male international table tennis player from Hong Kong.

Table tennis career
He won a bronze medal at the 1952 World Table Tennis Championships in the Swaythling Cup (men's team event) when representing Hong Kong. The team consisted of Cheng Kwok Wing, Chung Chin Sing, Fu Chi Fong and Suh Sui Cho. He also reached the fourth round of the singles.

See also
 List of table tennis players
 List of World Table Tennis Championships medalists

References

Hong Kong male table tennis players
World Table Tennis Championships medalists